Spain will compete at the 2014 Summer Youth Olympics, in Nanjing, China from 16 August to 28 August 2014.

Medalists
Medals awarded to participants of mixed-NOC (Combined) teams are represented in italics. These medals are not counted towards the individual NOC medal tally.

Sports

3-on-3 Basketball

Spain qualified a female team due to their third position at the 2013 FIBA World Championship Female 3x3 Basket. Later Spain qualified a boys' team based on the 1 June 2014 FIBA 3x3 National Federation Rankings.

Skills Competition

Boys' Tournament

Roster
 Adnan Omeragic Alic
 Xabier Oroz Uria
 Eduardo Sanchez Arevalo
 Arnau Triginer I Solanas

Group stage

Knockout Stage

Girls' Tournament
Roster
 Ana Begona Calvo Diaz
 Laia Flores Costa
 Helena Orts I Martinez
 Lucia Togores Carpintero

Group stage

Knockout Stage

Archery

Spain qualified a female archer from its performance at the 2013 World Archery Youth Championships.

Individual

Team

Athletics

Spain qualified 12 athletes.

Qualification Legend: Q=Final A (medal); qB=Final B (non-medal); qC=Final C (non-medal); qD=Final D (non-medal); qE=Final E (non-medal)

Boys
Track & road events

Field Events

Girls
Track & road events

Field events

Badminton

Spain qualified two athletes based on the 2 May 2014 BWF Junior World Rankings.

Singles

Doubles

Canoeing

Spain qualified one athlete based on its performance at the 2013 World Junior Canoe Sprint and Slalom Championships.

Girls

Cycling

Spain qualified a girls' team based on its ranking issued by the UCI.

Team

Mixed Relay

Field Hockey

Spain qualified a male team from its victory at the 2013 European sub-18 Field-Hockey Championship.

Boys' Tournament

Roster

 Manuel Bordas I Fabregas
 Jordi Farres Palet
 Licas Garcia Alcalde
 Marcos Giralt Ripol
 Enrique Gonzalez de Castejon Veli
 Jan Lara Rosell
 Pol Parrilla Suarez
 Llorenc Piera Grau
 Joan Tarres Fortuny

Group stage

Quarterfinal

Semifinal

Bronze medal match

Golf

Spain qualified one team of two athletes based on the 8 June 2014 IGF Combined World Amateur Golf Rankings.

Individual

Team

Judo

Spain qualified one athlete based on its performance at the 2013 Cadet World Judo Championships.

Individual

Team

Modern Pentathlon

Spain qualified one athlete based on its performance at the 2014 Youth A World Championships and another based on the 1 June 2014 Olympic Youth A Pentathlon World Rankings.

Rowing

Spain qualified one boat based on its performance at the 2013 World Rowing Junior Championships.

Qualification Legend: FA=Final A (medal); FB=Final B (non-medal); FC=Final C (non-medal); FD=Final D (non-medal); SA/B=Semifinals A/B; SC/D=Semifinals C/D; R=Repechage

Rugby Sevens

Spain qualified a female team from their fourth position at the 2013 Rugby Sevens World Cup, being the best ranked European team.

Girls' Tournament
Roster

 Maitane Berasaluce Heras
 Teresa Bueso Gomez
 Amaia Erbina Arana
 Raquel Garcia Godin
 Ainhoa Garcia Terron
 Hannah Gascoigne Gomez de Bonill
 Florencia Paulos
 Anna Ramon Guardia
 Marina Seral Arespacochaga
 Ana Tortosa Reyes
 Ana Vila Sanchez
 Paula Xutgla Reixach

Group stage

Placing 5-6

Sailing

Spain qualified one boat based on its performance at the 2014 Techno 293 European Championships in Torbole, Garda, Italy.

Swimming

Spain qualified eight swimmers.

Boys

Girls

Mixed

Taekwondo

Spain qualified one athlete based on its performance at the Taekwondo Qualification Tournament.

Boys

Triathlon

Spain qualified two athletes based on its performance at the 2014 European Youth Olympic Games Qualifier.

Individual

Relay

References

2014 in Spanish sport
Nations at the 2014 Summer Youth Olympics
Spain at the Youth Olympics